Shri Jairambhai School is the secondary school of the Gokhale Education Society locatred in Nashik Road, Maharashtra.The school offers education 
from 5th standard to 10th standard in the Indian education system. In the 10th standard year, the school conducts the Secondary School Certificate examination by Maharashtra State Board of Secondary and Higher Secondary Education. 

Schools in Nashik